Old Furnace Wildlife Area is a state wildlife area located in Sussex County, Delaware, just to the east of the town of Seaford, Delaware. It is made up of four land tracts totalling , it is managed by Delaware Department of Natural Resources and Environmental Control (DNREC), Division of Fish and Wildlife.

References

Protected areas of Delaware
Protected areas of Sussex County, Delaware